Samuel Ralph "Subway Sam" Nahem (October 19, 1915 – April 19, 2004) was an American  pitcher for the Brooklyn Dodgers (1938), St. Louis Cardinals (1941), and Philadelphia Phillies (1942 and 1948). His professional baseball playing was interrupted by military service (1942–1946) with the United States Army in the European Theater of Operations during World War II.

Early and personal life
Nahem was born in New York City, and was Jewish.  His parents Jacob and Esther Nahem had immigrated from Aleppo, Syria, to the United States, firstly to the Lower East Side in Manhattan where he was initially raised, and then moved to Brooklyn.  His first language was Arabic, as his family were Arabic-speaking Syrian Jews, and he and his seven siblings grew up on Ocean Parkway and in the Bensonhurst section of Brooklyn.

His father, who owned an import-export business, later drowned when the British passenger steamship SS Vestris sank off the coast of Virginia on November 12, 1928.  Nahem also was the uncle of Major League Baseball outfielder Al Silvera, who was the son of his sister Vicky.

He rebelled against Hebrew school when he was 13 years old.  He later went to New Utrecht High School, where he was unable to make the baseball team. Nahem then attended Brooklyn College, where he pitched for the school's baseball team and played quarterback and fullback for its football team, graduating in 1935.

While in the college he also started participating in Communist Party activities. He quit the Communist Party in the mid-1950s after the Soviet Union invaded Hungary.

He and his wife Elsie, whom he met after World War II and who died in 1974, had three children, Ivan, Joanne, and Andrew.

Baseball career
After graduating from Brooklyn College, Nahem signed with the Brooklyn Dodgers. During the off-season he attended St. John's University School of Law, earning a law degree and passing the bar examination in 1941.  He was known for reading literature in the dugout and in the bullpen, and for quoting Shakespeare and de Maupassant in conversations.

In the minor leagues in 1937 he was 15–5 with the Clinton Owls of the Illinois-Indiana-Iowa League, and then pitched for the Elmira Pioneers of the Eastern League in 1938, the Montreal Royals of the International League and the Nashville Volunteers of the Southern Association in 1939, the Louisville Colonels of the American Association and Houston Buffaloes of the Texas League in 1940 (when he led the league in ERA), and the Columbus Redbirds of the American Association in 1941. He joked that he played for so many teams, he became known as "formerly of ..., as in 'Sam Nahem, formerly of ..."

He made his major league debut in 1938 at the age of 22. Asked about his tenuous standing with the Dodgers after he was shelled in a spring training game in 1940, he responded to a reporter: "I am in the egregiously anonymous position of pitching batting practice to the batting practice pitchers."  In June 1940, he was traded by the Dodgers with Carl Doyle, Bert Haas, and Ernie Koy to the St. Louis Cardinals for Curt Davis and future Hall of Famer Joe Medwick.

In 1941, he pitched a career-high 81 innings, and had a record of 5–2 with an ERA of 2.98 for the Cardinals. February 1942 he was purchased by the Philadelphia Phillies from the Cardinals. In 1942 Nahem was 9th in the NL in games finished (16), and in 1948 he was 7th in the league (17). His career was interrupted by military service starting in 1943, when he volunteered to enlist despite being asthmatic.

In four Major League seasons Nahem had a 10–8 win–loss record. In 90 games, he started 12 games and had 3 complete games, 42 games finished, 224 innings pitched, 222 hits allowed, 138 runs, 117 earned runs, 8 home runs, 127 walks, 101 strikeouts, 7 hit batsmen, 9 wild pitches, and a 4.69 ERA.

Upon joining the military in 1942, Nahem spent two years at Fort Totten, where he pitched for the Anti-Aircraft Redlegs of the Eastern Defense Command. He set a Sunset League record with an ERA of 0.85, and came second in batting with a .400 average.  Upon being sent abroad in late 1944, in addition to serving in an anti-aircraft artillery division, he organized two servicemen's baseball leagues in Reims, France, and managed and pitched for his own team, the Overseas Invasion Service Expedition All-Stars, which featured Negro league players Leon Day and Willard Brown. The team won the 1945 military European World Series at the Nuremberg grounds, defeating the 71st Infantry Division Red Circlers, who included seven Major League players and only white players. Nahem was a strong supporter of the racial integration of baseball. He noted years later: "The majority of my fellow ballplayers, wherever I was, were very much against black ballplayers, and the reason was economic and very clear. They knew these guys had the ability to be up there and they knew their jobs were threatened directly and they very, very vehemently did all sorts of things to discourage black ballplayers."

Nahem played winter ball with the Navegantes del Magallanes club of the Venezuelan Professional Baseball League, where he pitched 14 consecutive complete games in the 1946–47 season to set a league record that still stood as of July 2017.

Nahem combined practicing law and working as a longshoremen while playing semi-professionally with the Brooklyn Bushwicks, in 1947 pitching the team to a 3–0 one-hit victory over the World Series All-Stars, which included Major League players Eddie Stanky, Ralph Branca, and Phil Rizzuto. After his second spell with the Phillies, for whom he pitched his last game in September 1948 at 32 years of age, he was released.

He told an interviewer: "I’ve been mentioned in the same breath as Koufax.  The breath usually is, ‘Sam Nahem is no Sandy Koufax.’"

Later life
Nahem moved to the East Bay in the San Francisco Bay area in 1955, and then to Berkeley, California, in 1964, partly due to McCarthyite blacklisting which made it difficult for him to secure employment. He worked at the Chevron chemical plant in Richmond for 25 years, retiring in 1980. During his time there he was also a rank-and-file organizer and leader for the Oil, Chemical and Atomic Workers International Union.

Nahem died at his home in Berkeley, at the age of 88.

See also

List of Jewish baseball players
Jews and Baseball: An American Love Story, 2010 documentary

Sources

External links

1915 births
2004 deaths
United States Army personnel of World War II
American people of Syrian-Jewish descent
Brooklyn College alumni
Brooklyn Dodgers players
Clinton Owls players
Columbus Red Birds players
Elmira Pioneers players
Houston Buffaloes players
Jewish American baseball players
Jewish Major League Baseball players
Louisville Colonels (minor league) players
Major League Baseball pitchers
Montreal Royals players
Nashville Vols players
Navegantes del Magallanes players
American expatriate baseball players in Venezuela
Philadelphia Phillies players
St. Louis Cardinals players
Baseball players from New York City
St. John's University School of Law alumni
People from Bensonhurst, Brooklyn
New Utrecht High School alumni
Members of the Communist Party USA
United States Army soldiers